Lost in Space (Part II) is an EP to the German Avantasia album The Scarecrow.

Track listing

Bonus features 
The Road to Avantasia (Studio Report with interview)
Slideshow

Personnel
 Tobias Sammet – Lead vocals, bass 
 Sascha Paeth – Rhythm & lead guitars
 Eric Singer – Drums
 Michael "Miro" Rodenberg – Keyboards/Orchestration

Guest vocalists
 Jørn Lande (Track 2)
 Michael Kiske (Track 2)
 Amanda Somerville (Tracks 1, 6)

Guest musicians
 Henjo Richter – Additional lead guitars (Tracks 2, 3, 4)

References 

Avantasia albums
2007 EPs